Melantius may refer to:

Melantius (bishop of Toledo) (d. c. 324)
a character in The Maid's Tragedy (1619)